Obaidul Haque was a politician, teacher and the former Member of Parliament of Sylhet-5.

Early life and education
Haque was born on 2 January 1934 into a Bengali Muslim in the village of Wazirpur in Kholachhora Union, Zakiganj, Sylhet District, Bangladesh. He completed his primary education locally, before enrolling as a student at the Dubag Junior High School up  until class 8. He then studied at the Ranaping Arabia Hussainia Madrasa in Dhakauttar, Golapganj. After that, he studied at the Ashraful Uloom Madrasa in Bara Katara, Dhaka. In addition to Bengali, Haque was fluent in Urdu and Arabic.

Career
Haque began his career as a teacher at the Lalarchak Madrasa in Rajaganj Union, Kanaighat under the instruction of his teacher Riyasat Ali. In 1960, he became a teacher at the Ranaping Arabia Hussainia Madrasa which he continued to do as a teacher of Hadith there until his death. He served as the former co-president of the Befaqul Madarisil Arabia Bangladesh and president of the Azad Deeni Edaraye Talim Bangladesh.

Haque was elected to parliament from Sylhet-5 as a Islami Oikya Jote candidate in 1991.

Death
Haque died on 17 January 2008. He was buried near the Wazirpur Jame Mosque in Sheola-Zakiganj Road. His son was Dr Shamsul Haque.

References

Islami Oikya Jote politicians
2008 deaths
5th Jatiya Sangsad members
1934 births
People from Zakiganj Upazila
20th-century Bengalis
Deobandis
Bengali Muslim scholars of Islam
Bangladeshi Sunni Muslim scholars of Islam